Nancy is an American comic strip, originally written and drawn by Ernie Bushmiller and distributed by United Feature Syndicate and Andrews McMeel Syndication. It was spun off from Fritzi Ritz, a strip Bushmiller inherited from creator Larry Whittington in 1925.  After Fritzi's niece Nancy was introduced in 1933, Fritzi Ritz evolved to focus more and more on Nancy instead of Fritzi.  The new strip took the old one's daily slot, while Fritzi Ritz continued as a Sunday, with Nancy taking the Sunday slot previously filled by Bushmiller's Phil Fumble strip beginning on October 30, 1938.

History

1922 to 1982 
The character of Nancy, a precocious eight-year-old, first appeared in the strip Fritzi Ritz, a comic about a professional actress and her family and friends. Larry Whittington began Fritzi Ritz in 1922, and it was taken over by Bushmiller three years later. On January 2, 1933, Bushmiller introduced Fritzi's niece, Nancy. In 1949, he was quoted as saying that he originally intended Nancy "just as an incidental character and I planned to keep her for about a week and then dump her... But the little dickens was soon stealing the show and Bushmiller, the ingrate, was taking all the bows." Nancy became the focus of the daily strip, which was renamed for her in 1938 after Lawrence W. Hager, the editor of the Owensboro, Kentucky Inquirer-Messenger (now the Messenger-Inquirer), lobbied for the change; Sluggo Smith, Nancy's friend from the "wrong side of the tracks" had been introduced earlier that year, and the strip's popularity rose. Fritzi Ritz became a secondary character, although her solo strip continued as a Sunday-only strip, where her relationship with Phil Fumble (who'd been featured in his own Sunday topper strip since 1932) was an ongoing presence until his departure in 1968. Comics historian Don Markstein ascribed the strip's success to Bushmiller's "bold, clear art style, combined with his ability to construct a type of gag that appealed to a very broad audience.

Fritzi Ritz continued as a Sunday feature (with Nancy as a topper) until 1968, when it too was replaced with Nancy permanently. At its peak in the 1970s, Nancy ran in more than 880 newspapers, before falling to 79 shortly before Guy Gilchrist's departure from the strip in 2018.

1982 to 2018 
The strip continued to be produced by different writers and artists. Mark Lasky briefly handled the daily strip in 1982/1983 until his death from cancer at age 29. Al Plastino worked on Sunday episodes of Nancy from 1982 to 1984 after Bushmiller died. During that period, David Letterman showed on TV a Nancy panel with Plastino's signature and made a joke about Plastino as a superhero name. (Letterman's writers were apparently unaware that Plastino was known for his superheroes.)

The daily strip was handed to Jerry Scott in 1983 and the Sunday in 1985. Scott gradually started to draw the strip in a much different, more modern style than other incarnations. In 1994, the syndicate began seeking a replacement for Scott; applicants included Ivan Brunetti and Gary Hallgren. In 1995, Guy and Brad Gilchrist were given control of the strip; Guy Gilchrist subsequently became the sole writer and illustrator.

Daily credits, post-Bushmiller:
 Mark Lasky: August 29, 1982 – July 9, 1983 (Lasky's first signed strip appeared on October 11, 1982)
 unknown artist: July 11, 1983 – October 8, 1983
 Jerry Scott: October 10, 1983 – September 2, 1995
 Guy (and Brad) Gilchrist: September 4, 1995 – February 17, 2018

Sunday credits:
 Al Plastino: November 21, 1982 – December 30, 1984 (Plastino's first signed strip appeared on November 28, 1982)
 Jerry Scott: January 6, 1985 – August 27, 1995
 Guy (and Brad) Gilchrist: September 3, 1995 – February 18, 2018

2018 to present 
After 22 years, Gilchrist's last Nancy strip came out on February 18, 2018, which involved the marriage between the characters of Fritzi Ritz and Phil Fumble. The strip resumed on April 9 with a "21st-century female perspective" by Olivia Jaimes (a pen name), the strip's first female creator. At the time of the announcement, 75 newspapers still ran the strip. Jaimes said, "Nancy has been my favorite sassy grouch for a long time. I'm excited to be sassy and grouchy through her voice instead of just mine" and "the Nancy I know and love is a total jerk and also gluttonous and also has big feelings and voraciously consumes her world". Comics historian Tom Spurgeon described Jaimes as funny and talented, with an approach to the character that both breaks with and pays homage to Bushmiller's version.

In the process, Jaimes updated the content of the strip, such as Nancy frequently using her smartphone and attending robotics classes. The September 3, 2018 strip spawned an Internet meme, depicting Nancy riding a hoverboard using two phones, one of which was attached to a selfie stick, and proclaiming that "Sluggo is lit." Jaimes described her aim with that strip to "most upset the person who likes me the least ... somebody who's like, 'Nancy sucks now' ... what I imagine my greatest hater would despise most is Nancy interacting with every piece of technology using words you don't understand."

Art style 
Bushmiller refined and simplified his drawing style over the years to create a uniquely stylized comic world. The American Heritage Dictionary of the English Language illustrates its entry on comic strip with a Nancy cartoon. Despite the small size of the reproduction, both the art and the gag are clear, and an eye-tracking survey once determined that Nancy was so conspicuous that it was the first strip most people viewed on a newspaper comics page.

In a 1988 essay, "How to Read Nancy", Mark Newgarden and Paul Karasik offered a probing analysis of Bushmiller's strip:

Comics theorist Scott McCloud described the essence of Nancy:

Cartoonist Wally Wood described Nancys design more succinctly: "By the time you decided not to read it, you already had."

Characters 
Primary characters

 Nancy Ritz, a typical and somewhat mischievous eight-year-old girl. She encourages her friend Sluggo to improve himself and is instantly jealous of any other girls who pay attention to him. During Gilchrist's run, she was portrayed as living in Three Rocks, Tennessee (a suburb of Nashville) although her home town was unspecified by other artists. Bushmiller located her home as 220 Oak Street next to Elm Avenue. She attends Central Elementary School in the Jaimes version. Aside from creating Nancy as Fritzi's niece, Bushmiller claimed to know nothing about her lineage, adding 'Very occasionally, I get curious kids asking me, but I don't know what to tell them.'
 Fritzi Ritz, Nancy's paternal aunt, with whom she lives. When Nancy initially appeared in the Fritzi Ritz comic strip, Fritzi was living with her father, George. The Fritzi character was gradually phased out in the mid-1980s before being dropped entirely by the end of the decade but returned as a main character in 1995 when the strip was taken over by brothers Brad and Guy Gilchrist. In the current version of Nancy, Fritzi acts as Nancy's full-time carer.
 Sluggo Smith, Nancy's best friend, introduced in 1938. Sluggo is Nancy's age and is a poor ragamuffin-type from the wrong side of the tracks. He is sometimes described as Nancy's boyfriend. He is portrayed as lazy, and his favourite pastime seems to be napping; in 1976 Bushmiller told a reporter who asked how Sluggo supported himself: "I assume he delivers groceries on Saturday, or something like that." In the Gilchrist version, Sluggo lives at 720 Drabb Street in an abandoned house he found and according to a storyline in 2013 strips, is taken care of by truck driver "uncles" Les and More, who discovered that he had lived in an orphanage; his mother died after he was born, and his father died serving his country. Sluggo's Uncle Vince is "shady" and his rich Aunt Maggie in California doesn't care about him because he reminds her of when she was poor. Sluggo ran away from the orphanage, his cousin Chauncey gave him $200 and he took the train as far as Three Rocks.

Secondary characters
 Agnes and Lucy, Nancy's identical twin friends in the Jaimes version. Agnes, the more wily twin, wears her hair down, and Lucy, the more idealistic and artistic twin, wears her hair up.
 Amal, Magnet School student who was opposing team captain during a basketball competition (Jaimes version).
 Art camp counselor, an unnamed character in the Jaimes version, who is a very physically fit art teacher.
 Dae-hyun: "Dae-hyun was first introduced in the 5/16/20 Nancy. He is a student at the Magnet School who also works as an announcer. His hobbies are studying and skateboarding. His favorite food is pizza." (Jaimes version).
 Derek, the number one socializer at the Magnet School (Jaimes version). 
 Devon P., Robotics Competition opponent from North Elementary School (Jaimes version). 
 Esther, a girl in Nancy's class in the Jaimes version. Introduced in 2018, she has a patchy relationship with Nancy.
Grandma, Nancy's grandmother in the Jaimes version.
Jerome, Magnet School student who writes poignant short stories (Jaimes version). 
 Judy, Nancy's cousin who looks like her.
 Leon, Magnet School student (Jaimes version).
 Lyle, a blonde male classmate of Nancy's in the Jaimes version, who nearly always wears sandals with socks, regardless of the weather.
 Marigold, Sluggo's tomboy cousin.
 Melissa Bangles, one of Nancy's teachers in the Jaimes version, who had thwarted hopes of a basketball career.
 Mildred, originally Esther's and then also Nancy's rival in the Jaimes version. She goes to a nearby magnet school that Esther used to also attend.
 Nita, Nancy's math and robotics teacher, a character in the Jaimes version whose internal monologue often reflects on the difficulty and rewards of teaching.
 Old man, an unnamed character in the Jaimes version, a cranky oldster who has been affectionately dubbed "Ernest Dangit" by some fans.
 Oona Goosepimple, the spooky-looking child who lives in a haunted house down the road from Nancy's house. She originally appeared only in the comic book version of the strip, during John Stanley's tenure in the late 1950s and early 1960s. She appeared in the actual comic strip for the first time on October 16, 2013.
 Pee Wee, a neighborhood toddler who is known for his extreme literalness.
 Phil Fumble, Fritzi's boyfriend. When Nancy debuted in the Fritzi Ritz comic strip, Fritzi had a procession of boyfriends, such as "Wally". Phil Fumble was the subject of his own strip by Bushmiller. He was written out in 1968 but made a reappearance in the November 27, 2012, strip, and became a regular character as of early January 2013, with the intention of furthering his relationship with Aunt Fritzi. Phil and Fritzi married in Gilchrist's last strip. This character does not currently appear in Jaimes' version of the strip.
 Poochie, Nancy's dog (white with a large black spot on its back and black ears). A white dog with a black patch on its back and one black ear, identified by Nancy as hers, first appeared in the strip on January 13, 1933, however this dog was known as 'Woofy'. Poochie was first seen in the Jaimes version of the strip on June 27, 2018, although she was not mentioned by name in the Jaimes version until September 23, 2019. Poochie is regarded by Nancy and Fritzi as foolish, but she often outsmarts them. 
Pussycat, Nancy's adopted stray cat, who does not currently appear in the Jaimes version of the strip. Nancy first attempted to adopt an (unnamed) cat on January 18, 1933.
 Rollo Haveall, the stereotypical but nonetheless friendly rich kid. In the early 1940s, the strip's "rich kid" was known as Marmaduke and in 2013, Rollo's father's name is given as Rollo Marmaduke Sr.
 Spike Kelly (a.k.a. Butch), the town bully who frequently fights with Sluggo, but does not always win out.

Awards 
Bushmiller won the National Cartoonists Society's Humor Comic Strip Award for 1961 and the Society's Reuben Award for Best Cartoonist of the Year in 1976.

In 1995, the strip was selected as one of the 20 in the "Comic Strip Classics" series of commemorative U.S. postage stamps.

Comic books 
There were first several Fritzi Ritz comic stories in comics published by United Feature Syndicate. These include Fritzi Ritz No. 1 (1948), 3–7 (1949), #27–36 (1953–1954); United Comics #8–36 (1950–1953); Tip Topper Comics #1–28 (1949–1954); St John published Fritzi Ritz #37–55 (1955–1957). Dell published Fritzi Ritz #56–59 (1957–1958)

Nancy appeared in comic books—initially in a 1940s comic strip reprint title from United Feature, later St. John Publications and later in a Dell comic written by John Stanley. Titled Nancy and Sluggo, United Feature published #16–23 (1949–1954), St. John published #121–145 (1955–1957). Titled Nancy, until retitled Nancy and Sluggo with issue No. 174, Dell published #146–187 (1957–1962). (Hy Eisman produced some of Dell's Nancy stories in 1960–61. Gold Key published #188–192 (1962–1963). Dell also published Dell Giants devoted to Nancy (#35, No. 45 and "Traveltime"), and a Four Color #1034. Nancy and Sluggo also appeared in stories in Tip Top Comics published by United Feature (#1–188), St. Johns (#189–210), and Dell (#211–225), Sparkler #1–120 (1941–1954) and Sparkle #1–33 (1953–1954) published by United Feature. Fritzi Ritz and Nancy appeared in several Comics on Parade (#32, 35, 38, 41, 44, 47, 50, 53, 55, 57, 60–104) published by United Feature.

Nancy was reprinted in the British comic paper The Topper, between the 1950s and the 1970s. Nancy also had its own monthly comic book magazine of newspaper reprints in Norway (where the strip is known as Trulte) during 1956–1959.

Animation 
Nancy was featured in two animated shorts by the Terrytoons studio in 1942–1943: School Daze and Doing Their Bit.

In 1971, several newly created Nancy and Sluggo cartoons appeared on the Saturday morning cartoon series Archie's TV Funnies, which starred the Archie Comic Series characters running a television station. Nancy appeared along with seven other comic strip characters: Emmy Lou, Broom-Hilda, Dick Tracy, The Dropouts, Moon Mullins, the Captain and the Kids and Smokey Stover. The series lasted one season. In 1978, she was also featured in several segments of Filmation's animated show Fabulous Funnies, a repackaging of Archie's TV Funnies material minus the Archie characters wraparounds.

Foreign versions 

Nancy has been translated into a variety of languages, often with changes to characters' names. In Sweden, the strip is called Lisa och Sluggo. In French, Nancy is called Philomène in Canada, and Zoé in France, where the strip is called Arthur et Zoé (Arthur being the French name of Sluggo). Nancy also appeared on the back cover of the popular Arabic children magazine Majid during the 80s, she was known as Moza while Sluggo was portrayed as her brother Rashoud. In Mexico she is known as Periquita, while Sluggo is called Tito. In Brazil, Nancy and Sluggo were called Xuxuquinha and Marciano in the 60s and in the following decade as Tico and Teca (Sluggo and Nancy respectively).

Cultural references 
Bushmiller's art work has inspired other artists:

Comics
 Cartoonist Bill Griffith has used the characters and emulated Bushmiller's style frequently in his Zippy the Pinhead.
 Cartoonist Scott McCloud developed a card game, 5-card Nancy, in which players use random panels of Nancy to create their own stories. McCloud also included a Nancy cameo in his book Understanding Comics. When describing the "non-sequitur" transition type, several unrelated images appear between panels. One is an upside-down picture of Nancy being struck by lightning with the caption "Danger".
 Cartoonist Mark Newgarden has included Nancy in his work.
Pearls Before Swine cartoonist Stephan Pastis (known for using other comic characters in his strip) portrayed Nancy and Sluggo as extras to replace Rat and Goat during the 2003 "Pearls Labor Dispute".
 Mad has run several parodies, including "Nansy", in which Nancy is transformed into the main character of several other comic strips, including Donald Duck, Dick Tracy and Li'l Abner, all with that same hyphen-nose and frizzy hairdo. Also in Mad, Bushmiller gets the hardboiled treatment: "If Mickey Spillane Wrote Nancy".
 Quino's Mafalda bears a strong resemblance to the earlier Nancy, which Quino mocks in one strip, where Miguelito buys a Nancy magazine and shows it to Mafalda noticing the resemblance, only for Mafalda to retort (off-frame) that she looks more like his grandmother.
 Cartoonist Max Cannon often includes Stubbo, a boy drawn in Bushmiller's style, in his Red Meat strip.
 German cartoon duo Katz & Goldt (Stephan Katz and Max Goldt) appear as Sluggo and Nancy in their comics Homage to Ernie Bushmiller (2004) and Forty Million (2018)

Other media
 Nancy was the subject of Andy Warhol's 1961 painting Nancy.
 Nancy was the subject of several pop art works by Joe Brainard, collected in The Nancy Book (2008), Siglio Press. They include:
 If Nancy Was an Ashtray, 1972
 If Nancy Was a Boy, 1972
 If Nancy Was a da Vinci Sketch, 1972
 Nancy Diptych, 1974
 If Nancy Was a Painting by de Kooning, 1975
 In Mexico, the character, shown in the comic strips, become so popular that a socks company used her image and name in Spanish (Periquita) for a brand of girl's anklets very popular in Guadalajara, to the point it has her own song and commercials.
 Periquita #200 (a comic book edition of the Spanish-language version of Nancy) is seen on a table in a restaurant near the end of the film Roma.

Collections 
Comic strip (by Ernie Bushmiller)
 Nancy (1961), Pocket Books (The Fun-Filled Cartoon Adventures of Nancy)
 The Best of Ernie Bushmiller's Nancy by Brian Walker (1988), Henry Holt
 Kitchen Sink Press series:
 Nancy Eats Food (Volume 1) (1989)
 How Sluggo Survives (Volume 2) (1989)
 Nancy Dreams and Schemes (Volume 3) (1990)
 Bums, Beatniks and Hippies / Artists and Con Artists (Volume 4) (1990)
 Nancy's Pets (Volume 5) (1991)
 Everything I Need to Know I Learned from Nancy: The Enduring Wisdom of Ernie Bushmiller (1993), Pharos Books
 Nancy Is Happy: Complete Dailies 1942–1945 (2012), Fantagraphics Books (The first in a projected series reprinting 24 years worth of daily strips.)
 Nancy Likes Christmas: Complete Dailies 1946–1948 (2012), Fantagraphics Books
 Nancy Loves Sluggo: Complete Dailies 1949–1951 (2014), Fantagraphics Books

Comic book (by John Stanley)
 Nancy Vol. 1: The John Stanley Library (2009), Drawn & Quarterly
 Nancy Vol. 2: The John Stanley Library (2010), Drawn & Quarterly
 Nancy Vol. 3: The John Stanley Library (2011), Drawn & Quarterly

Comic strip (by Olivia Jaimes)
 Nancy: A Comic Collection (2019), Andrews McMeel Publishing

Random Acts of Nancy 
A spin-off titled Random Acts of Nancy began March 19, 2014, consisting of sampled single panels of Nancy comics drawn by Ernie Bushmiller. Creator John Lotshaw described the process:

When people ask me what Random Acts of Nancy is, I tell them it's their little daily ray of Absurdist sunshine. The lack of context - indeed, its very removal - is what attracted me to Random Acts the moment Guy explained it to me... The process begins by skimming through Nancy daily strips. Currently, we're using Ernie Bushmiller's art exclusively, but we're not limited to his work... Once I find a strip with a promising panel, I clean up the art as much as I can in Photoshop. I remove the extra panels, and then begin coloring the art. When the panel is colored, I run a filter on the art to create the halftone dots that make the panel look as if it was printed on an old-fashioned four-color press. Finally, I flatten the image and add the indicia, including the original publication date of the strip. Repeat the process until... well, I run out of material. Thanks to the genius of Ernie Bushmiller, that's not going to happen any time soon.

Following Guy Gilchrist's departure from Nancy, this strip was discontinued.

References

Further reading 
 Strickler, Dave. Syndicated Comic Strips and Artists, 1924–1995: The Complete Index. Cambria, California: Comics Access, 1995. .
 Karasik, Paul and Mark Newgarden. How to Read Nancy: The Elements of Comics in Three Easy Panels. Seattle: Fantagraphics Books 2017. .

External links 
 Nancy comic strip
 Classic Nancy
 nancyandsluggo.com
 Nancy at Toonopedia
 Dossena, Tiziano Thomas. "Guy Gilchrist: From the Muppets to Nancy, A Success Story", L'Idea Magazine, 2014

1938 comics debuts
American comic strips
Comics about women
Comics adapted into animated series
Comics spin-offs
Gag-a-day comics
Terrytoons characters
Works about orphans